The California Sunbirds were a women's professional softball team based in Stockton, CA.  They were one of the founding members of National Pro Fastpitch in 2004.  The team folded shortly after the 2005 season concluded.

Franchise history
The California Sunbirds were originally named the Sacramento Sunbirds.  Their agreement to play at Freedom Park at McClellan Park in Sacramento fell through, so they made arrangements to in Stockton at the United Sports Complex.  After that, they changed their name to the California Sunbirds.  However, they continued to use the URL https://web.archive.org/web/20100401111252/http://www.sacramentosunbirds.com/ for their team website.

The Sunbirds were coached by Tim Kiernan, one of the most prolific coaches in Northern California community college history.  At Sacramento City College, Kiernan had won more than 800 games, three state championships, and a national championship.

In 2005, the Sunbirds only played a partial NPF season in 2005, losing all 16 games they played.  There were hopes of returning to the league full-time in 2006, but it never happened and the team folded.

Season-by-season 

|-
|2004 || 15 || 43 || 0 || 6th place National Pro Fastpitch || Did not qualify
|-
|2005 || 0 || 16 || 0 ||colspan=2|Played only a partial schedule, they were not included in NPF standings 
|-
!Totals || 15 || 59 || 0
|colspan="2"|

References

External links 
 
 The Softball Channel

Softball teams in the United States
Defunct National Pro Fastpitch teams
Sports clubs established in 2004
2004 establishments in California
Defunct softball teams in the United States
Defunct sports teams in California
Softball in California
Women's sports in California